CS Alterna Bank, operating as Alterna Bank, is a Canadian direct bank and a wholly owned subsidiary of the Ontario-based credit union Alterna Savings. The bank offers chequing and high-interest savings accounts and mortgages.

Operating primarily as a direct bank since 2017, most customers access accounts using the bank's website, telephone service, and mobile apps. Unlike most other direct banks, some accounts can also be accessed through branches. There are two Alterna Bank locations in Gatineau, Québec, and Alterna Savings branches also administer deposits and loans on its behalf, to which the bank outsources most of its processes. Customers can make debit purchases using their access cards, write cheques, and make surcharge-free transactions at automated teller machines within The Exchange Network. Its flexibility has brought it attention from publications such as The Globe and Mail as a sound alternative to the Big Five banks.

The bank originated as the Civil Service Loan Corporation, founded 29 October 1992 and operating as CS Loan Corporation. It became CS Alterna Bank after receiving letters patent of continuation on 2 October 2000 as a federally regulated institution under the Bank Act. It continues to use the same institution number (#608). Its parent organization, the Civil Service Co-operative Credit Society, operated as CS CO-OP. The merger of CS CO-OP and Metro Credit Union in 2005 created Alterna Savings, adopting its subsidiary's name.

Alterna Bank is a member of Canada Deposit Insurance Corporation (CDIC).

See also

 List of banks in Canada
 Alterna Savings
 Motive Financial
 Simplii Financial
 Tangerine

References

External links
 Alterna Bank

Banks of Canada
Banks established in 1992
1992 establishments in Ontario
Companies based in Ottawa
Alterna Savings
Online banks